Guilherme Frederico Feria Bentes (born 10 June 1973 in Lisbon) is a Portuguese judoka.

Achievements

References
 
Profile

1973 births
Living people
Portuguese male judoka
Judoka at the 1996 Summer Olympics
Olympic judoka of Portugal
Sportspeople from Lisbon